Peplow railway station was a station in Peplow, Shropshire, England. The station was opened in 1867 and closed in 1963. The track has been infilled to form the garden for the station house which is now a private residence along with a waiting shelter on the northbound platform.

References

Further reading

Disused railway stations in Shropshire
Railway stations in Great Britain opened in 1867
Railway stations in Great Britain closed in 1963
Former Great Western Railway stations